The 2005 Australian Open was a Grand Slam tennis tournament held in Melbourne, Australia from 17 until 30 January 2005. Roger Federer was unsuccessful in defending his 2004 title, being defeated in the semi-finals by eventual champion Marat Safin in a rematch of the 2004 final. Safin defeated third-seed Lleyton Hewitt in the final in four sets. Justine Henin-Hardenne could not defend her 2004 title due to an injury suffered in the second half of 2004. Serena Williams, the champion in 2003, defeated Lindsay Davenport in the women's final.

Seniors

Men's singles

 Marat Safin defeated  Lleyton Hewitt, 1–6, 6–3, 6–4, 6–4
It was Safin's 1st title of the year, and his 15th overall. It was his 2nd career Grand Slam title, his 1st Australian Open title and the last championship of his career. Safin became the second Russian player to win the Australian Open men's singles title, following Yevgeny Kafelnikov's victory in 1999.

Women's singles

 Serena Williams defeated  Lindsay Davenport, 2–6, 6–3, 6–0
It was Williams's 1st title of the year, and her 26th overall. It was her 7th career Grand Slam title, and her 2nd Australian Open title. The final featured a long injury time out for Williams in the second set at 3-3.

Men's doubles

 Wayne Black /  Kevin Ullyett defeated  Bob Bryan /  Mike Bryan, 6–4, 6–4

Women's doubles

 Svetlana Kuznetsova /  Alicia Molik defeated  Lindsay Davenport /  Corina Morariu, 6–3, 6–4

Mixed doubles

 Samantha Stosur /  Scott Draper defeated  Liezel Huber /  Kevin Ullyett, 6–2, 2–6, [10–6]

Juniors

Boys' singles

 Donald Young defeated  Kim Sun-yong, 6–2, 6–4

Girls' singles

 Victoria Azarenka defeated  Ágnes Szávay, 6–2, 6–2

Boys' doubles

 Kim Sun-yong /  Yi Chu-huan defeated  Thiemo de Bakker /  Donald Young, 6–3, 6–4

Girls' doubles

 Victoria Azarenka /  Marina Erakovic defeated  Nikola Fraňková /  Ágnes Szávay, 6–0, 6–2

Legends

Men's doubles
  Richard Fromberg /  Mats Wilander defeated  Pat Cash /  Kim Warwick, 6–4, 6–3,

Mixed doubles
  Nicole Bradtke /  Roy Emerson defeated  Elizabeth Smylie /  Tony Roche, 7–5, retired

Wheelchair

Men's singles
 David Hall defeated  Robin Ammerlaan, 7–5, 3–6, 6-1

Women's singles
 Mie Yaosa defeated  Maaike Smit, 7–6(5), 6-1

Men's doubles
 Robin Ammerlaan /  Martin Legner defeated  David Hall /  Anthony Bonaccurso, 6–4, 6–3

Women's doubles
 Maaike Smit /  Florence Gravellier defeated  Yuka Chokyu /  Mie Yaosa, 6–3, 6-3

Seeds
Withdrawals:  Justine Henin-Hardenne,  Kim Clijsters,  Jennifer Capriati

Men's singles
  Roger Federer (semifinals, lost to Marat Safin)
  Andy Roddick (semifinals, lost to Lleyton Hewitt)
  Lleyton Hewitt (final, lost to Marat Safin)
  Marat Safin (champion)
  Carlos Moyá (first round, lost to Guillermo García López)
  Guillermo Coria (fourth round, lost to David Nalbandian)
  Tim Henman (third round, lost to Nikolay Davydenko)
  Andre Agassi (quarterfinals, lost to Roger Federer)
  David Nalbandian (quarterfinals, lost to Lleyton Hewitt)
  Gastón Gaudio (third round, lost to Dominik Hrbatý)
  Joachim Johansson (fourth round, lost to Andre Agassi)
  Guillermo Cañas (fourth round, lost to Nikolay Davydenko)
  Tommy Robredo (third round, lost to Marcos Baghdatis)
  Sébastien Grosjean (second round, lost to Jean-René Lisnard)
  Mikhail Youzhny (second round, lost to Rafael Nadal)
  Tommy Haas (second round, lost to Karol Beck)
  Andrei Pavel (second round, lost to Bobby Reynolds)
  Nicolás Massú (second round, retired against Philipp Kohlschreiber)
  Vincent Spadea (first round, lost to Radek Štěpánek)
  Dominik Hrbatý (quarterfinals, lost to Marat Safin)
  Nicolas Kiefer (first round, lost to Olivier Rochus)
  Ivan Ljubičić (second round, lost to Marcos Baghdatis)
  Fernando González (third round, lost to David Nalbandian)
  Feliciano López (third round, lost to Joachim Johansson)
  Juan Ignacio Chela (third round, lost to Lleyton Hewitt)
  Nikolay Davydenko (quarterfinals, retired against Andy Roddick)
  Paradorn Srichaphan (second round, lost to Jarkko Nieminen)
  Mario Ančić (third round, lost to Marat Safin)
  Taylor Dent (third round, lost to Andre Agassi)
  Thomas Johansson (fourth round, lost to Dominik Hrbatý)
  Juan Carlos Ferrero (third round, lost to Guillermo Coria)
  Jürgen Melzer (third round, retired against Andy Roddick)

Women's singles
  Lindsay Davenport (final, lost to Serena Williams)
  Amélie Mauresmo (quarterfinals, lost to Serena Williams)
  Anastasia Myskina (fourth round, lost to Nathalie Dechy)
  Maria Sharapova (semifinals, lost to Serena Williams)
  Svetlana Kuznetsova (quarterfinals, lost to Maria Sharapova)
  Elena Dementieva (fourth round, lost to Patty Schnyder)
  Serena Williams (champion)
  Venus Williams (fourth round, lost to Alicia Molik)
  Vera Zvonareva (second round, lost to Vera Dushevina)
  Alicia Molik (quarterfinals, lost to Lindsay Davenport)
  Nadia Petrova (fourth round, lost to Serena Williams)
  Patty Schnyder (quarterfinals, lost to Nathalie Dechy)
  Karolina Šprem (fourth round, lost to Lindsay Davenport)
  Francesca Schiavone (third round, lost to Nathalie Dechy)
  Silvia Farina Elia (fourth round, lost to Maria Sharapova)
  Ai Sugiyama (first round, lost to Martina Suchá)
  Fabiola Zuluaga (second round, lost to Anna-Lena Grönefeld)
  Elena Likhovtseva (third round, lost to Karolina Šprem)
  Nathalie Dechy (semifinals, lost to Lindsay Davenport)
  Tatiana Golovin (second round, lost to Abigail Spears)
  Amy Frazier (third round, lost to Evgenia Linetskaya)
  Magdalena Maleeva (third round, lost to Nadia Petrova)
  Jelena Janković (second round, lost to Tatiana Panova)
  Mary Pierce (first round, lost to Stéphanie Cohen-Aloro)
  Lisa Raymond (third round, walkover lost to Anastasia Myskina)
  Daniela Hantuchová (third round, lost to Elena Dementieva)
  Anna Smashnova (third round, lost to Venus Williams)
  Shinobu Asagoe (second round, lost to Li Na)
  Gisela Dulko (second round, lost to Mariana Díaz Oliva)
  Flavia Pennetta (first round, lost to Petra Mandula)
  Jelena Kostanić Tošić (second round, lost to Nicole Vaidišová)
  Iveta Benešová (first round, lost to Ana Ivanovic)

References

External links
Australian Open official website

 
 

 
2005 in Australian tennis
2005,Australian Open
January 2005 sports events in Australia